The Deluge Drivers (1987) is a science fiction novel by American writer Alan Dean Foster.  It is the final entry in Foster's Icerigger Trilogy of books taking place in the Humanx Commonwealth book series.  The two earlier books in the series are Icerigger and Mission to Moulokin.

Plot introduction
After resigning himself to perhaps being trapped on Tran-Ky-Ky for the rest of his life, Ethan Fortune learns that scientists at the outpost of Brass Monkey have detected a steady warming in the planet’s atmosphere. This has caused something not seen in generations on the planet: open water on the ice oceans. Taking the giant icerigger Slanderscree with a crew of Tran to investigate, Fortune learns that the warming of the oceans is not an accidental or natural event.

External links

Alan Dean Foster homepage

1987 American novels
Humanx Commonwealth
Novels by Alan Dean Foster
1987 science fiction novels
American science fiction novels
Sequel novels
Del Rey books